I Am the Moon is the fifth studio album by American blues rock group Tedeschi Trucks Band. It is a quadruple album which was initially released in four separate parts over consecutive months in 2022: Crescent (released on June 3), Ascension (released on July 1), The Fall (released on July 29) and Farewell (released on August 26), with each album including a corresponding short film. The completed album was released via Fantasy Records on September 9, 2022 and is the band's first since 2019's Signs. 

Conceptually, the project is based on the story of Layla and Majnun, a romantic poem of Arabian origin about star-crossed lovers.

Track listing
Credits adapted from AllMusic. 
I Am the Moon I: Crescent

I Am the Moon II: Ascension

I Am the Moon III: The Fall

I Am the Moon IV: Farewell

Personnel 
 Brandon Boone - bass guitar; baritone guitar (disc II 2, 4; disc III 5), additional acoustic guitar (disc II 6)
 Isaac Eady - drums, percussion; additional acoustic guitar (disc II 6)
 Gabe Dixon - keyboards, vocals; lead vocals (disc I 1, 3; disc II 2, 7; disc III 4; disc IV 2, 4), acoustic guitar (disc I 3), additional acoustic guitar (disc II 6)
 Tyler Greenwell - drums, percussion; acoustic guitar (disc I 4; disc II 7), additional acoustic guitar (disc II 6)
 Susan Tedeschi - lead vocals (except disc I 2, 5; disc II 6; disc III 5); guitar (disc I 2, 3, 4; disc II 1, 2, 6; disc III; disc IV 4), drums (disc II 4)
 Derek Trucks - lead and rhythm guitars (except disc III 1); steel guitar (disc I 2), acoustic guitar (disc I 1, 3; disc IV 4, 5), additional acoustic guitar (disc II 6), percussion (disc II 4; disc IV 6), tabla (disc II 7)
 Kebbi Williams - saxophone; flute (disc II 7)
 Elizabeth Lea - trombone
 Ephraim Owens - trumpet
 Alecia Chakour - vocals; additional percussion (disc I 1, 2, 4; disc II 2, 5; disc III 1; disc IV 2, 6)
 Mike Mattison - vocals; lead vocals (disc I 2; disc III 5), acoustic guitar (disc III 2, 3, 5; disc IV 6), additional acoustic guitar (disc II 6)
 Mark Rivers - vocals; lead vocals (disc III 6), additional percussion (disc I 1, 2, 4; disc II 2; disc IV 6)

Additional musicians
 Adrian Jackson - sousaphone (disc I 2; disc II 6; disc III 4, 5)
 Paul Olsen - acoustic guitar (disc I 3; disc II 1, 6; disc III 2, 6; disc IV 1, 4)
 Marc Quiñones - congas, additional percussion (disc I 3; disc II 1, 5; disc III 1, 3, 4; disc IV 2)
 St. EOM - dialog (disc I 4)
 Eric Krasno - lead and rhythm guitar (disc IV 4)

Charts
Crescent

Ascension

The Fall

Farewell

References

2022 albums
Tedeschi Trucks Band albums
Fantasy Records albums